Blissfield Community Schools is a school district in Lenawee County, Michigan in the United States. It consists of a high school, middle school, and an elementary school. The District includes the village of Blissfield, and parts or all of Blissfield Township, Riga Township, Palmyra Township, Ogden Township, and Deerfield. Grades K-12 are housed in three buildings and serve approximately 1300 students.

Elementary school

Blissfield Elementary School offers grades K-5. The principal is Linda Mueller.

Middle school
Blissfield Middle School offers grades 6-8. The middle school principal is Cris Rupp. BMS switches classes, has six class periods, and a homeroom class.

Sports
Sports are offered for grades 6, 7 and 8. Football, Basketball, Volleyball, Competitive Cheer, Wrestling, and track, for 7th. Football, Basketball, sideline cheer, Volleyball, Competitive Cheer, Wrestling, and track for 8th. Track and Wrestling are for 6th.

Theatre
The music teacher occasionally puts on a musical in the fall, like Aladdin Jr. (2010–2011), and The Legend Of Sleepy Hollow (2009–2010). There is usually a spring play.

Schedule
Blissfield Middle School Daily Schedule
7:40 - 2:40

References

External links
http://www.blissfieldschools.us

Education in Lenawee County, Michigan
School districts in Michigan